Minoa was an ancient town on the island of Amorgos. It was the birthplace of Simonides of Amorgos.

The site of Minoa is located near modern Katapola, on Moundoulia Hill. It is believed to have once been a palace of the mythological King Minos.

References

Populated places in the ancient Aegean islands
Former populated places in Greece
Amorgos
Ancient Greek archaeological sites in Greece